Matthew Fontaine Maury High School also known as Maury High School, is a high school located in the Ghent area of Norfolk, Virginia, United States. Maury's school mascot is the Commodore. The high school is named for Matthew Fontaine Maury. In 2007, Newsweek placed Maury High School in the top 1300 of America's Top Public High Schools. Maury High School and rival Granby High School were the only schools from the Norfolk Public School system to place. Maury High School has a Pre-Medical Health and Specialities Program for 9th-12th graders. It is the only school in the district to have this type of speciality program.

History
Maury High School opened its doors in 1911 and was completely renovated in 1986. This modernization maintained the architectural integrity of the original neo-classical structure while converting Maury into an educational facility complete with media center and cafeteria atria where unused courtyards once stood.

Notable alumni
 Al Richter: Major League Baseball player
 Kishi Bashi (1994): singer and songwriter
 Kam Chancellor (2006): Super Bowl XLVIII champion, safety for the Seattle Seahawks in the NFL
 Samuel Face, inventor known for his work in concrete technology
 Ed Schultz (1972): liberal political commentator and host of radio program The Ed Schultz Show and television program The Ed Show, college football play-by-play announcer for North Dakota State and North Dakota
 Tommy Scott (1926): first head football coach at Old Dominion University
 Joe Smith (1993): basketball player and number-one pick in the 1995 NBA Draft
 Keely Smith (1946): singer
 Tony Tchani (2008): Major League Soccer midfielder and winner of the 2009 General Douglas MacArthur Memorial Trophy, awarded to the most outstanding collegiate athlete who attended high school in Virginia.
 G. William Whitehurst (1942): professor at Old Dominion University, Republican United States Representative for Virginia's 2nd congressional district (1969–1987)
 John Charles Thomas (judge) (1968): first African American of the Virginia state supreme court 
 LaRoy Reynolds (2009): linebacker for the Atlanta Falcons in the NFL
 Emmy Raver-Lampman (2007): Actress and Singer. Most notable for Netflix series The Umbrella Academy (2019–present), which is her breakthrough role.
 Lewis Binford (1950): Archaeologist, early pioneer of Processual archaeology/New archaeology.
 Roy Martin (1939): 131st mayor of Norfolk, 31st President of the United States Conference of Mayors

Notes

References

External links
 Norfolk Public Schools
 Maury High School
 

Educational institutions established in 1911
High School
Public high schools in Virginia
Schools in Norfolk, Virginia
1911 establishments in Virginia